Simaro Massiya Lutumba Ndomanueno (19 March 1938 – 30 March 2019), known as Simaro, was a Congolese music rhythm guitarist, songwriter, poet, composer, and bandleader. He was a member of the seminal Congo music band TPOK Jazz, which dominated the music scene in the Democratic Republic of the Congo (DRC) from the 1960s to the 1980s.

Early life
Simaro was born in Uíge Province, Angola.

Music career with OK Jazz
Simaro started playing with Franco Luambo, the founder of OK Jazz, in 1961. They were later joined by Josky Kiambukuta and Ndombe Opetum. Youlou Mabiala and Madilu System also played with OK Jazz, before their solo careers. Simaro served as Vice President of the band for many years and led the group during Franco's long trips to Europe during the 1980s. His composition of the band's hit song 'Mabele' earned him the nickname 'Poet'. DRC authorities jailed him, Franco and other musicians, for two obscene songs in the late 1970s. Simaro is considered as one of the greatest poets, singers and philosophers of Congolese music.

Discography
Simaro is credited with composing many songs for the band, including:

Likambo Zi Tu Zoto Esilkata Te - Sung by Michel Boyibanda, Josky Kiambukuta and Sam Mangwana
 Oko Regretter Ngai Mama - Sung by Michel Boyibanda, Josky Kiambukuta, Wuta Mayi and Lola Checain
 Bodutaka - Sung by Sam Mangwana, Michèl Boyibanda, Josky Kiambukuta and  Lola Chécain
 Mabele - Sung by Sam Mangwana
 Eau Benite - Sung by Madilu System
 Maya - Sung by Carlyto Lassa
 Testament ya Bowule - Sung by Malage de Lugendo
 Vaccination - Sung by Kiesse Diambu
 Ebale ya Zaire - Sung by Sam Mangwana
 Faute Ya Commercant - Sung by Sam Mangwana
 Cedou - Sung by Sam Mangwana, Michel Boyibanda & Franco
 Bisalela - Sung by Youlou Mabiala, Josky Kiambukuta, Michel Boyibanda and Wuta Mayi
 Mbongo - Sung by Djo Mpoyi
 Salle d'attente - Sung by Ferre Gola, Josky Kiambukuta, M'bilia Bel and Papa Wemba
   Kadima - Sung by Djo Mpoyi

Music career post OKJazz
Following Franco's death in 1989, Simaro agreed to continue the band, sharing 30% of revenue with the late band leader's family. In 1993 OKJazz split over disagreements how funds were shared. Simaro and 30 OKJazz musicians formed Bana OK in 1994.

Death
Simaro Massiya Lutumba died in a hospital in Paris, France, on Saturday 30 March 2019. The musician was known to suffer from diabetes and hypertension.

See also 
African Rumba
Music of the Democratic Republic of the Congo
Francois Luambo Makiadi
List of African musicians

References

External links
Interview With Simaro Lutumba In 2002
Overview of TPOK Jazz - Written In 2012

1938 births
2019 deaths
People from Kinshasa
Democratic Republic of the Congo guitarists
Soukous musicians
TPOK Jazz members